Quzuchi Avin (also Romanized as Qūzūchī Avīn; also known as Qūzūchī Owlan) is a village in Gavdul-e Sharqi Rural District, in the Central District of Malekan County, East Azerbaijan Province, Iran. At the 2006 census, its population was 353, in 93 families.

References 

Populated places in Malekan County